The Chapel of Our Lady of the Snows is the name given to a temple excavated in a cave in the ice near the Belgrano II base in the territory it claims as part of Argentine Antarctica. It is one of eight churches on Antarctica.

This church in a cave with walls made of ice is the most southern place of worship of any religion in the world. It is a permanent Catholic church for the whole year of Argentina base and scientific research station founded in 1955 on Coats Land.

See also 

 Religion in Antarctica
 Chapel of the Snows

References 

Roman Catholic chapels in Antarctica